The great myna (Acridotheres grandis), also known as the white-vented myna, is a species of starling in the family Sturnidae. It is found in Northeast India, through Bangladesh to Southeast Asia.

Description 
It is black with elongated forehead feathers, forming a frontal crest that may curl backwards. Its beak and feet are yellow. It has white from the vent to the tip of the tail and a white wing patch.

Images

References

great myna
Birds of Northeast India
Birds of Southeast Asia
great myna
Taxonomy articles created by Polbot